Treang District is a district located in Takéo Province, in southern Cambodia. According to the 1998 census of Cambodia, it had a population of 98,386.

Administration
Treang District is divided into 14 communes, 154 villages (as of 2019).

References 

 
Districts of Takéo province